Karabalgasun inscription is a 9th century trilingual inscription located in the Karabalgasun, the historical capital of the first Uyghur Khaganate, in Mongolia. The stele bearing the inscription is believed to be erected during the reign of the eighth Uighur ruler, Baoyi Qaghan (r. 808-21 CE). Written in Old Turkic, Sogdian, and Chinese, the inscription marks the qaghan’s military accomplishments and those of his predecessors, as well as their adoption and support of the Manichean religion. Encyclopædia Iranica describes it as "one of the most important sources for the history of the Uighur Steppe Empire (744-840 CE) and the study of Manicheism in China and Central Asia", citing many of the historical events recorded in the inscription are only known from it.

The fragments of the inscription were first discovered by the Russian explorer Nikolai Yadrintsev in 1889.

Context
The first line of the stele, which is copied in the shield-shaped tablet on top, names the qaghan to whom it was dedicated:

This ruler was the eighth qaghan of the empire, and the inscription was established either during his reign or shortly after his death in 821 CE. The wording of the first lines seem to indicate close parallel between the Sogdian and the Old Turkic versions, from which the Chinese is independent.

References 

History of Mongolia
Chinese inscriptions
Uyghur inscriptions
Sogdian language
9th-century inscriptions